Apple crisp is a dessert made with a streusel topping. In the US and Canada, it is also called apple crumble, a word which refers to a different dessert in the UK, Australia, and New Zealand.

Ingredients usually include cooked apples, butter, sugar, flour, cinnamon, and often oats and brown sugar, ginger, and/or nutmeg. One of the most common variants is apple rhubarb crisp, in which the rhubarb provides a tart contrast to the apples.

Many other kinds of fruit crisps are made.  These may substitute other fruits, such as peaches, berries, or pears, for the apples.

History
Apple crisp is a relatively modern dish. It is notably absent from the first edition of the Fannie Farmer Cookbook (1896), which is a comprehensive collection of American recipes.

The earliest reference to apple crisp in print occurs in 1924, with a recipe in the Everybody's Cook Book: A Comprehensive Manual of Home Cookery, Isabel Ely Lord [Harcout Brace and Company: New York] 1924 (p. 239). In 1924, apple crisp also makes an appearance in a newspaper article in the Appleton Post Crescent on Tuesday, December 9, 1924 (Appleton, Wisconsin). Its popularity further spread during World War II, when food rationing limited access to pastry ingredients used for making apple pies.

Despite its relatively recent invention, apple crisp or crumble has become an American and British tradition especially during the autumn, when apples are plentiful. The dish is also very popular in Canada, especially in areas where berries and fruit are readily available.

Variations of this dish are much older. For example, a recipe for apple pandowdy is in Miss Corson's Practical American Cookery, 1886.

Similar dishes

There are a number of desserts that employ apples with sweet toppings, but none of them are the same as apple crisp, making them not so much variants, but instead other related apple desserts.

Apple Brown Betty (or apple pudding) consists of alternating layers of apples and sweetened buttered bread crumbs or crackers, often with a sauce.

Apple cobbler (also known as apple slump, apple grunt, and apple pandowdy) is an old recipe in which the baked apples are topped with a cobbler crust formed of batter, pie crust or baking powder biscuit dough.  The topping may be dropped onto the top of the apples in clumps, which have a 'cobbled' appearance, thus the name.  Apple pan dowdy most commonly features a pie crust, which is broken ("dowdied") before serving: it is a pie, not a cobbler. A 'grunt' is a cobbler cooked on top of the stove and a 'slump' is fruit and biscuit dumplings which is turned upside down after being baked so that the fruit is slumped into the fruit with a fork.  

Apple crumble is a British pudding similar to the apple crisp that originated during World War II food rationing. The crumble topping is made of butter, flour, and brown sugar rolled together so that it resembles breadcrumbs. Care must be taken to balance the correct amount of crumble with the fruit, or else the filling may seep through and spoil this crust. Crumble is traditionally served with custard, but today it is sometimes served with cream or ice cream. Crumbles made from apples, and sometimes other fruits, are also common in Australia, New Zealand and Ireland.

Eve's pudding is a British dessert that is essentially a sponge cake atop the apples. The name may originate from the biblical reference to Eve and the apple in the Garden of Eden.

See also
 Apple pie
 Cottage pudding
 List of apple dishes
 List of desserts
 List of pies, tarts and flans

References

External links

Food Timeline history Notes: Apple Pie

American pies
Crisp